The Barry P. Bonvillain Civic Center, formerly known as the Houma-Terrebonne Civic Center, is a 5,000-seat multi-purpose arena in Houma, Louisiana, USA, that hosts corporate functions, such as meetings, training seminars, conferences, as well as formal banquets, wedding receptions, group conventions, consumer shows, professional wrestling, family theater and other performing arts, concerts, graduations, religious services, indoor and outdoor festivals. It opened on January 6, 1999.  

The  Civic Center is a multi-purpose building with a 5,000-seat arena, a theatrical / banquet area with a 2,500 person capacity, and a  meeting room area.  The facility was built at a cost of $18.1 million.  There are 3,200 retractable seats at the arena.

It was home to the Houma Bayou Bucks of the National Indoor Football League from 2002 to 2004, and the Houma Conquerors of the Southern Indoor Football League in 2009.

See also
List of convention centers in the United States
List of music venues

References

External links
Houma Terrebonne Civic Center website. Retrieved on 2006-01-20. 
 "Houma Terrebonne Civic Center", Cultural Resources and Economic Development, City of Houma, Louisiana. Retrieved on 2006-01-20.

Basketball venues in Louisiana
Convention centers in Louisiana
Indoor arenas in Louisiana
Music venues in Louisiana
Sports in Houma, Louisiana
Buildings and structures in Terrebonne Parish, Louisiana
Sports venues in Louisiana
Volleyball venues in Louisiana
1999 establishments in Louisiana
Sports venues completed in 1999